The following is a list of American Thomas & Friends video releases in chronological order.

1990

1991

1992

1993

1994

1995

1996

1997

1998

1999

2000

2001

2002

2003

2004

2005

2006

2007

2008

2009

2010

2011

2012

2013

2014

2015

2016

2017

2019

2020

Movies and Specials

References

Thomas & Friends videos
Lists of home video releases